Fannie Ellsworth Stone Newberry (1848–1942) wrote a long series of books, many of them stories for girls, of which the best seller was The Wrestler of Philippi.

Newberry was born in Monroe, Michigan, on May 7, 1848, the daughter of Hiram and Sophia Stone.
When Newberry was five, she moved to Chicago. She attended the Young Ladies Seminary of Monroe, Michigan. At age 17 she graduated from a school in Brookline, Massachusetts.
In August, 1867 she married attorney Frank D. Newberry (June 23, 1840 – December 28, 1912) of Rochester, Michigan, who died in San Jose, California.
They had four children: Max, Perry, Roy, and Grace. She died on January 24, 1942, aged 93, and is buried in Coldwater, Michigan.

Works 
Impress of a Gentlewoman (1891)
Sara, A Princess (1892)
The Odd One: a Story for Girls (c1893)
The Wrestler of Philippi: A tale of the early Christians (1896)
A son's victory; a story of the land of the honey-bee (c1897)
Strange conditions (1898)
All Aboard (1898)
Joyce's Investments (1899)
Not For Profit
Bubbles
Mellicent Raymond
The House of Hollister
Bryen's Home
The Young Housekeeper

References

External links 

 
 
 
 The Online Books Page (University of Pennsylvania)

People from Brookline, Massachusetts
American children's writers
1848 births
1942 deaths